In Motion may refer to:
 In Motion (film), a 2002 Russian drama film directed by Filipp Yankovsky
 In Motion (Copeland album)
 In Motion (David Becker Tribune album), 1991
 In Motion (Joey Yung album)
In Motion (Richard Poole, Gary Peacock, and Marilyn Crispell album), 2016
 "In Motion" (hide song), 2002
 "In Motion" (Allday song), 2017